Twin Lakes is the name of multiple communities in the U.S. state of Colorado :

 Twin Lakes, Adams County, Colorado
 Twin Lakes, Lake County, Colorado